Miodrag "Miško" Marić (born 17 February 1957), is a Serbian former basketball player. He played for Partizan from 1974 to 1986 and remains the third scorer in the club's history with 4,668 points.

References

1957 births
Living people
BC CSKA Sofia players
Centers (basketball)
KK Partizan players
KK Vojvodina players
Serbian expatriate basketball people in Bulgaria
Serbian men's basketball players
Yugoslav men's basketball players
Sportspeople from Užice
Competitors at the 1979 Mediterranean Games
Mediterranean Games silver medalists for Yugoslavia